Witold Woyda (10 May 1939 – 5 May 2008) was a Polish fencer who won four Olympic medals in the foil between 1964 and 1972, including two gold medals at the 1972 Summer Olympics. He was named the Polish Sportspersonality of the Year for 1972 by readers of Przegląd Sportowy. Born in Poznań, he immigrated to the United States in the late 1970s, settling in Bronxville, New York, and worked for an Italian packaging company.  He had lung cancer for two years prior to his death at his Bronxville home at age 68, five days shy of turning 69.

References

External links

1939 births
2008 deaths
Polish male fencers
Olympic fencers of Poland
Olympic gold medalists for Poland
Olympic silver medalists for Poland
Olympic bronze medalists for Poland
Fencers at the 1960 Summer Olympics
Fencers at the 1964 Summer Olympics
Fencers at the 1968 Summer Olympics
Fencers at the 1972 Summer Olympics
Sportspeople from Poznań
Polish emigrants to the United States
Deaths from lung cancer in New York (state)
Olympic medalists in fencing
Medalists at the 1964 Summer Olympics
Medalists at the 1968 Summer Olympics
Medalists at the 1972 Summer Olympics
Recipients of the Order of Polonia Restituta (1944–1989)
Burials at Powązki Military Cemetery
20th-century Polish people
21st-century Polish people